Khvastovichsky District is an administrative and municipal district (raion), one of the twenty-four in Kaluga Oblast, Russia. It is located in the south of the oblast. Its administrative center is the rural locality (a selo) of Khvastovichi. As of the 2021 Census, the total population of the district was 9,888, with the population of Khvastovichi accounting for 44.8% of that number.

References

Notes

Sources

Districts of Kaluga Oblast
